John Ernest Greaves CBE (30 November 1847 – 27 February 1945) was a wealthy Welsh slate mine owner and Lord Lieutenant of Caernarvonshire.

Early life 
He was born on 30 November 1847 at Tan-yr-allt, Tremadog, the son of John Whitehead Greaves, who had been instrumental in the development of the slate industry around Blaenau Ffestiniog. He spent much of his childhood at his father's Llechwedd quarry and was educated at schools in Warwickshire, Edinburgh and Dorset before going to Worcester College, Oxford, where he matriculated in 1867.

Slate industry 
On his father's death he inherited a half share in the business and made his brother Richard Methuen Greaves the General Manager. They later turned the business into a limited company with John as Chairman and Richard as Managing Director.

Public life 
He was appointed High Sheriff of Merionethshire for 1884 and for Caernarvonshire for 1885. He was also a Deputy Lieutenant for Caernarvonshire. In 1886, he was appointed Lord Lieutenant of Caernarvonshire, the first commoner to hold the position, serving until 1933.

He was very involved in public affairs as President of the North Wales branch of the NSPCC, and Chairman of the Quarter Sessions and Alderman of Caernarvon County Council. He had a particular interest in nursing standards and from 1898 was on the Council of Queen Victoria's Jubilee Institute for Nurses and was Chairman of the North Wales Nursing Association.

Personal life 
He inherited the family home at Bron Eifion, near Criccieth, but in 1893 also bought the Glan Gwna estate near Caernarfon, rebuilding the hall there.

He married Marianne Rigby (1851-1934), with whom he had a daughter Dorothy (1876-1963). He died on 27 February 1945, leaving Glan Gwna to Dorothy's elder daughter, also Dorothy (1906-1966), who in 1930 in Fiji had married William Stanley Flower (1902-1940), elder son of Stanley Smyth Flower.

Honours
Greaves was appointed a Commander of the Most Excellent Order of the British Empire and in 1931 a Commander of the Most Venerable Order of the Hospital of Saint John of Jerusalem.

References

1847 births
1945 deaths
People from Gwynedd
Alumni of Worcester College, Oxford
Welsh industrialists
High Sheriffs of Merionethshire
High Sheriffs of Caernarvonshire
Deputy Lieutenants of Merionethshire
Lord-Lieutenants of Caernarvonshire
Commanders of the Order of the British Empire
Commanders of the Order of St John
National Society for the Prevention of Cruelty to Children people